The Masseur is a 2005 Filipino psychological drama film co-story and directed by Brillante Mendoza in his directorial debut. This film is about a young man who gives massages to gay men in Manila and had a relationship.

Plot
Iliac is a young masseur who went home to Pampanga to find out that his bedridden father is dead. Iliac assists in the preparation of his father's burial including dressing his dead father up inside the morgue.

Cast
 Coco Martin as Iliac
 Jaclyn Jose as Naty
 Alan Paule as Alfredo/Marina Hidalgo
 Katherine Luna as Tessa
 R.U. Miranda as Lorena
 Aaron Christian Rivera as Maldon
 Arianne Camille Rivera as Faye
 Ronaldo Bertubin as Manager
 Norman Pineda as Edmond
 John Baltazar as Anthony
 Jan-el Esturco as Errand Boy
 Erlinda Cruz as Jean
 Rose Mendoza as Rose
 Mary Anne dela Cruz as Jean
 Maximiano Sultan as Rodel
 Josefina Punzalan as Funeral Parlor Directress
 Jayson Colis as Axel
 Randel Reyes as John
 Paolo Rivero as Andrew
 Kristopher King as Lester
 Marvin Bautista as Dennis
 Adan Bolivar as Gabriel
 Kim Relucio as Louie
 Jaypee Basco as Edwin
 Joe Armas as Jay
 Jetro Rafael as Ferdinand
 Joel Ilagan as Masseur
 Domineek Almoete as Client A
 Odsz Molina as Client B
 Ferdie Lapuz as Client C
 Monti Parungao as Client D
 Ino Amoyo as Client E
 Lou Veloso as Client F
 Paolo Cruz as Client G
 Orly Myco as Mason
 Janice Fernandez as Nurse
 Ador Dincol as Photographer
 Neth Mendoza as Mourner
 Jean Tubal as Mourner
 Auring Manguerra as Mourner
 Nenita Manguerra as Mourner
 Juliet Santillan as Mourner
 Brando Mendoza as Mourner

Awards

References

External links 
 

2005 films
Philippine LGBT-related films
2000s Tagalog-language films
Philippine erotic films
Films directed by Brillante Mendoza
LGBT-related drama films
2005 LGBT-related films
2005 drama films
Philippine psychological drama films
2000s psychological drama films